Andrew Flynn (1895 – ?) was an English professional footballer who played as a full back. He played for Mexborough, Exeter City, York City and Boston Town.

Career
Born in Sheffield, West Riding of Yorkshire, Flynn played for Mexborough of the Midland League before joining Third Division South Exeter City in 1922. He made his league debut for Exeter against Southend United on 9 December, and scored his first and only goal for the club with the winner in a 1–0 victory away at Swindon Town 16 February 1924. However, Flynn failed to command a regular place in the Exeter team during his four-season stay, finishing his time at the club with 34 league appearances and one goal.

Flynn returned to playing Midland League football after signing for York City in August 1926, making his debut on 28 August in a 1–1 draw at home to Loughborough Corinthians. He was ever-present for York in the 1926–27 season, appearing in all of York's 38 Midland League matches. He also played in York's seven FA Cup games that season, in a run that saw the club reach the first round for the first time in its history, eventually being knocked out in the second round away at Grimsby Town on 11 December. Flynn missed two games the following season, against Scarborough and Mexborough Athletic, in which he made 48 appearances in all competitions. He left York following the end of the season, having made 93 appearances in all competitions, joining Boston Town as a player and a trainer.

Style of play
Flynn played as a full back, and was able to operate on both the right and left sides.

References

1895 births
Footballers from Sheffield
English footballers
Association football defenders
Mexborough Town F.C. players
Exeter City F.C. players
York City F.C. players
Boston Town F.C. (1920s) players
English Football League players
Midland Football League players
Year of death missing